Streptomyces hiroshimensis is a bacterium species from the genus of Streptomyces which has been isolated from soil. Streptomyces hiroshimensis produces the red pigment prodigiosin.

See also 
 List of Streptomyces species

References

Further reading

External links
Type strain of Streptomyces hiroshimensis at BacDive -  the Bacterial Diversity Metadatabase

hiroshimensis
Bacteria described in 1991